Britt Damberg (married Britt Elisabet Lindroth; 11 January 1937 – 31 March 2019) was a Swedish Schlager and jazz singer and occasional actress.

Life and career

In 1954, Britt Damberg first entered the world of music finishing second in an amateur singing competition behind Siw Malmkvist. In 1957, she performed at Gröna Lund with Seymour Österwall. She was also a regular singer at Skansen with Leif Kronlund's orchestra and traveled to Gaza and Congo as an artist performing for the UN troops. In 1962 she had a supporting role in the Swedish film classic Raggargänget starring along, amongst others, Ernst-Hugo Järegård, Sigge Fürst, Jan-Olof Strandberg and Laila Westersund. In 1959, she had her breakthrough performing the song "Nya fågelsången" (written by Sam Samson and Fritz-Gustaf Sundelöf) at Säg det med musik: Stora Schlagertävlingen, which served as Swedish national selection for the Eurovision Song Contest 1959. Eventually, her entry finished in third place. The following year, 1960, she reached third place again, this time being one of two artists who performed the song "Nancy Nancy". Her biggest success was the song "Hälsa Mikael från mig", which reached number 9 on the Show Business magazine charts in April 1963 and also served as the title track of her first (and also last) LP released in 1966.

In the 1970s, she became a preschool teacher and left the music business. She still occasionally appeared as a jazz singer at Stampen music club in Stockholm. In 2003, she had a minor role in the Swedish short film Skala 1:1. She was married to fellow artist Björn Lindroth (1931–1999) until his Death. from 1965 and then cohabited with musician Rune Öfwerman (1932–2013) until his death.

Discography 
På tal om kärlek
Massor av kyssar – 1960
Hälsa Mikael från mig (Single) – 1962
Johan på Snippen-twist – 1962
Johnny Jingo – 1962
Kysser dom godnatt [Kiss the Boys Goodbye] – 1964
Kärleksland [Gloryland]
Hälsa Mikael från mig (Album) – 1966

Filmography
1962 – Raggargänget
2003 – Skala 1:1

References

1937 births
People from Köping
2019 deaths
20th-century Swedish women singers
Melodifestivalen contestants of 1960